The following are the records of Panama in Olympic weightlifting. Records are maintained in each weight class for the snatch lift, clean and jerk lift, and the total for both lifts by the Federación Panamena de Levantamiento de Pesas.

Men

Women

References

records
Panama
Olympic weightlifting
weightlifting